The Battle of Mount Elba was a minor skirmish of the American Civil War, occurring on 30 March 1864 at the town of Mount Elba, Arkansas. It was part of U.S. General Steele's Camden Expedition.

As a supporting effort to the Camden Expedition, to help fix Confederate forces at Monticello, Arkansas, and prevent them from opposing Steel's march to Camden, Arkansas, Col. Powell Clayton conducted a raid on Longview, Arkansas, a port on the Saline, southwest of Monticello. Clayton's cavalry force crossed the Saline at Mount Elba, after sweeping aside a small guard force. Clayton divided his forces and sent part to establish a blocking position to the west near Marks Mill. One hundred picked men under Lieutenants Greathouse and Young were then dispatched to destroy the Confederate pontoon bridge at Longview.

On March 29, the lieutenants surprised and captured approximately 250 soldiers belonging to Brig. Gen. Thomas P. Dockery's brigade at Longview. Confederate forces in the area were now alerted to the presence of Clayton's raiders and attempted to cut off Clayton's command by attacking their bridgehead at Mount Elba on March 30, 1864. Clayton was successful in re-crossing the Saline, defeating Confederate forces at the Battle of Mount Elba and returned to Pine Bluff, Arkansas, with over 260 prisoners. The Union's casualties throughout the expeditions were only two dead and eight missing.

The first Union action of the Union expedition was a complete success, but the rest of the expedition would not go as planned.

References

External links
 American Battlefield Trust

Battles of the American Civil War in Arkansas
Conflicts in 1864
1864 in Arkansas
March 1864 events
Union victories of the American Civil War